Dead Pigeon on Beethoven Street is episode 25, season 1, of Tatort, a German police procedural television program, directed by Samuel Fuller. It was given a theatrical release in the United States by Emerson Film Enterprises in 1975. A novelisation by Fuller appeared in the US.

Overview
An American private detective is killed in Germany while possessing incriminating photos, and his partner (Glenn Corbett) seeks revenge. Joining with the seductive blonde (Christa Lang) who appeared in the photos, the investigator hopes to discover who was behind them, and why his partner was killed for having them.

Production history
Fuller was offered the opportunity to direct an episode of the popular German crime drama by film critic (and later writer/director) Hans-Christoph Blumenberg in appreciation for the director's help in securing interviews with filmmakers Howard Hawks and John Ford for a documentary project. Upon meeting with the program's producers and feeling initial doubts about being able to conform to the show's standard template, he suggested a storyline inspired by the then-recent Profumo affair in England, which the producers approved to Fuller's surprise.

Fuller's screenplay took liberties with the established style of the show by eliminating a primary series protagonist early in the episode in order to introduce a one-time American character to helm the investigation, by conducting the majority of the program in English rather than German (though subtitles were provided in the German broadcast), and by ultimately treating the story with a satirical and often broadly comic tone.

Restoration
In March 2015, the UCLA Film and Television Archive premiered a restored director's cut which added additional footage previously unseen in its television broadcast or theatrical release.

References

External links

Trailer

Tatort
1972 films
1973 television films
1973 films
1973 television episodes
German television films
West German films
1970s crime drama films
Films directed by Samuel Fuller
German crime films
Films set in West Germany
Films set in Cologne
1970s German-language films
German-language television shows
Television episodes set in Germany
Television episodes about murder
1972 drama films
1970s English-language films
English-language German films
1970s German films
Das Erste original programming